Gino Pellegrini (1916-2006) was an Italian American mandolinist and composer.

Born in Stockton, California in 1916, he lived in Altopascio, Tuscany from age 5 until 17 before returning to California. He played in the Aurora Mandolin Orchestra at the 1939 World's Fair on Treasure Island, San Francisco, one of only a handful of mandolin orchestras at the time. He later re-founded the Aurora Mandolin Orchestra in 1970. He married his wife Josephine in 1994. After he died in Redwood City in 2006, Josephine continued on directing the Orchestra in his memory.

Further reading
Mignano Crawford, Sheri. Mandolins, Like Salami. Zighi Baci Publishing: Petaluma, CA, 2005.

References

Musicians from California
Music of California
Music of the San Francisco Bay Area
Musicians from the San Francisco Bay Area
American mandolinists
American expatriates in Italy
1916 births
2006 deaths